Life Force is a studio album by saxophonist Eric Kloss. It was recorded in 1967 and released in 1968 on Prestige Records.

Reception

AllMusic awarded the album 4 stars.

Track listing 
All compositions by Eric Kloss, except as indicated.
 "Soul Daddy" - 4:05   
 "You're Turning My Dreams Around" - 4:56   
 "Life Force" - 11:46   
 "Nocturno" - 6:38   
 "St. Thomas" (Sonny Rollins) - 5:24   
 "My Heart Is In The Highlands" - 8:48

Personnel 
Eric Kloss - alto saxophone
Jimmy Owens - trumpet, flugelhorn
Pat Martino - guitar
Ben Tucker - bass
Alan Dawson - drums

References 

1968 albums
Eric Kloss albums
Prestige Records albums
Albums produced by Don Schlitten